Gonzalo Matías Maulella Rodríguez (born July 6, 1984) is a Uruguayan footballer who plays as a defender for Atenas de San Carlos.

Career
Maulella joined Italy's Lega Pro Seconda Divisione side S.S.D. Città di Brindisi in November 2009.

References

External links
 
 

1984 births
Living people
Uruguayan footballers
Association football defenders
Central Español players
C.A. Rentistas players
Sportivo Luqueño players
Real Garcilaso footballers
Ayacucho FC footballers
Defensor Sporting players
Liverpool F.C. (Montevideo) players
Atenas de San Carlos players
Uruguayan expatriate footballers
Expatriate footballers in Italy
Expatriate footballers in Paraguay
Expatriate footballers in Spain
Expatriate footballers in Peru
Uruguayan expatriate sportspeople in Italy
Uruguayan expatriate sportspeople in Paraguay
Uruguayan expatriate sportspeople in Spain
Uruguayan expatriate sportspeople in Peru
Uruguayan Primera División players
Uruguayan Segunda División players
Peruvian Primera División players
Paraguayan Primera División players
Footballers from Paysandú